Jümme is a river of Lower Saxony, Germany. It is a tributary of the Leda.

The Jümme's headwaters are the Aper Tief, which flows from the Oldenburg geest, and the Soeste.

Fishing rights rest with the local fishing club, Fischereiverein Altes Amt Stickhausen, which issues fishing permits to its members and to visiting anglers.

The Jümme gives its name to the collective municipality of Jümme.

See also 
 List of rivers of Lower Saxony

References

External links 
 The Pünte - a floating monument on the Jümme 

Rivers of Lower Saxony
Geography of East Frisia
Rivers of Germany